Algrøyna or Algrøy is an island in Øygarden Municipality in Vestland county, Norway. The  island lies just west of the large island of Sotra and north of the small island of Lokøyna. There are a series of bridges connecting it to the island of Sotra, which in turn is connected to the mainland. Almost all the residents of the island live along the northern shore, in a village area that is referred to as Algrøyna.

See also
List of islands of Norway

References

Islands of Vestland
Villages in Vestland
Øygarden